Elliot Barnes-Worrell (born March 1991) is an English theatre and film actor known for his role as Easter in the ITV drama series Jericho (2016) and as Job Cloovers in the ITV crime drama series Van der Valk (2020).

Early life
Barnes-Worrell grew up in Peckham in the London Borough of Southwark. His father is the West Indian author, director and composer Trix Worrell.

While Barnes-Worrell was artistically a rapper, he attended a Hamlet performance in the Ovalhouse, in which an actor with black skin color played Hamlet. He took an interest and became a regular theatre goer. He began training as an actor at the BRIT School and then moved to the Royal Central School of Speech and Drama, where he graduated after winning the Sir John Gielgud Award. In 2012 he was awarded the Alan Bates Award by the Actors Center.

Career

Filmography

Theatre

References

External links
 
 

Living people
1991 births
21st-century English male actors
Alumni of the Royal Central School of Speech and Drama
Black British male actors
English male film actors
English male stage actors
English male television actors
People educated at the BRIT School
People from Peckham